SA de Transport Aérien Flight 730 was a Sud Aviation SE-210 Caravelle 10R aircraft, registered as HB-ICK, that crashed on approach to Funchal Airport, Madeira, on December 18, 1977.

The flight crew consisted of two captains. The pilot in command had never previously landed at Funchal and was being trained to operate from the notoriously difficult airport by the other, more experienced captain, who was acting as co-pilot. The training was intended to take place during daytime, but due to a delay the aircraft reached its destination after dark.

The non-scheduled flight departed from Zurich, making its first stop at Geneva Cointrin International Airport at 14:30 UTC. While at Geneva, the aircraft's departure to Funchal was delayed due to a hydraulic pump failure, and it finally took off at 16:26.

After being cleared for the approach the crew descended below the   permitted during circling, even though they had lost sight of the runway. The aircraft had its landing gear down and the flaps were extended to 20 degrees when it crashed into the water.

Thirty-five passengers and one hostess lost their lives, many becoming trapped inside the sinking fuselage. The remaining passengers and crew, including both pilots, were rescued by local fisherman and rescue teams, or swam to the nearby shore.

The cause of the accident was attributed to pilot error, due to lack of coordination between the pilots, and to sensorial illusion. It was the second fatal air crash in a month at Funchal. On November 19, TAP Portugal Flight 425 had crashed at the airport, killing 131 people.

Wreckage discovery

The aircraft had reportedly broken into two sections.

References

External links

 
Accident report - GPIAA 
Full report( )
Le site des pionniers de l'aéronautique à Genève

Airliner accidents and incidents caused by pilot error
Aviation accidents and incidents in 1977
Aviation accidents and incidents in Portugal
Accidents and incidents involving the Sud Aviation Caravelle
SA de Transport Aérien accidents and incidents
December 1977 events in Europe
1977 disasters in Portugal